Berzon is a surname. Notable people with the surname include:

Alexandra Berzon (born 1979), American reporter
Betty Berzon (1928–2006), American author and psychotherapist
Marsha Berzon (born 1945), American judge

See also
Berson